Gary Baker may refer to:

 Gary Baker (racing driver) (born 1946), former NASCAR driver
 Gary Baker (songwriter) (born 1952), American country music singer and songwriter
 Gary Baker, drummer with the band McCarthy
Gary Go (Gary Baker, born 1985), British singer, songwriter and producer

See also
Garry Baker (born 1953), Australian rules footballer